Oh Lord, Let Me Do No Wrong is an album led by saxophonist Pharoah Sanders recorded in 1987 and released on Bob Thiele's Doctor Jazz Records label.

Reception

In his review for AllMusic, Stewart Mason commented: "Oh Lord, Let Me Do No Wrong is a mellow and peaceful set by a player who no longer needs to make noise; whether old-school fans will appreciate this is debatable."

Chris May for All About Jazz says this about Leon Thomas' contributions to the album: "Thomas is heard on three tracks: "Oh Lord, Let Me Do No Wrong," which could almost be from the Spirits Known and Unknown sessions, and "If It Wasn't For A Woman" and "Next Time You See Me," which are downhome carnal blues."

Track listing
 "Oh Lord, Let Me Do No Wrong" – 5:35
 "Equinox" (John Coltrane) – 9:25
 "Polka Dots and Moonbeams" – 6:11
 "If It Wasn't for a Woman" – 4:39
 "Clear Out of This World" – 13:45
 "Next Time You See Me" – 3:54

Personnel
Pharoah Sanders – tenor saxophone
Donald Smith – electric piano
William S. Henderson III – acoustic piano
Tarik Shah – bass
Greg Banoy - drums
Leon Thomas - vocals (tracks 1, 4, and 6)

References

1987 albums
Pharoah Sanders albums
Albums produced by Bob Thiele